Cryptadapis is a genus of adapiform primate that lived in Europe during the late Eocene.

References

Literature cited

 

Prehistoric strepsirrhines
Prehistoric primate genera
Eocene primates
Eocene mammals of Europe
Paleogene France
Fossils of France
Quercy Phosphorites Formation
Fossil taxa described in 1984
Nomina dubia